The Naval Physical and Oceanographic Laboratory or NPOL is a laboratory of the Defence Research and Development Organisation (DRDO), under the Ministry of Defence, India. It is situated in Thrikkakara, Kochi, Kerala. NPOL is responsible for the Research & Development of sonar systems, technologies for underwater surveillance, study of ocean environment and underwater materials.

History 

The Indian Naval Physical Laboratory (INPL) was established in Kochi by Indian Navy in 1952. It worked initially as a field laboratory for fleet support activities. It was merged with DRDO in 1958 and started working on underwater systems. INPL was rechristened as Naval Physical Oceanographic Laboratory (NPOL).

Till 1990, NPOL functioned from within the Naval Base in Kochi. In 1990, it moved into a new  campus at Thrikkakara, a suburb of Kochi. The new campus has a main technical complex and two residential complexes - SAGAR and VARUNA. The technical complex houses the main building, Abhinavam building and several test facilities including an acoustic tank. Besides the campus in Thrikkakara, NPOL has an offsite setup of underwater acoustic research facility at Idukki Lake, 100 km east of Kochi. Since 1995, NPOL has operated INS Sagardhwani, a 2000-ton Oceanographic research vessel used for oceanographic data collection.

Areas of work
NPOL is developing a technology called seabed arrays that will be laid over the seabed surface for ocean surveillance which will provide measurements and inform the control centre about the happenings underneath through satellite. DRDO is planning a dedicated satellite for the coastal surveillance system.

All the future inductions planned by the Indian Navy are to be fitted with NPOL designed sonars. The sonars under development are HUMSA NG (upgrade of the HUMSA sonar), the submarine sonars USHUS (for the Sindhugosh class) and PAYAL for the Arihant class.

Underwater acoustics is another area which NPOL is looking at. The Physical Oceanographic conditions which will decide the propagation of the sound waves inside water is studied with the help of DRDO's Research Vessel INS Sagardhwani and in-house developed Ocean models. Different Sonar Range Prediction models are also developed by NPOL in the recent years which are used by Indian Navy.

References

External links
 NPOL Home Page

Defence Research and Development Organisation laboratories
Research institutes in Kochi
Research and development in India
1958 establishments in Kerala
Research institutes established in 1958